The 1995 NCAA men's volleyball tournament was the 26th annual tournament to determine the national champion of NCAA men's collegiate volleyball. The single elimination tournament was played at the Springfield Civic Center in Springfield, Massachusetts during May 1995.

UCLA defeated Penn State in the final match, 3–0 (15–13, 15–10, 15–10), to win their fifteenth national title. The Bruins (31–1) were coached by Al Scates. This was a rematch of the previous year's final, won by Penn State.

UCLA's Jeff Nygaard was named the tournament's Most Outstanding Player. Nygaard, along with five other players, comprised the All-Tournament Team.

Qualification
Until the creation of the NCAA Men's Division III Volleyball Championship in 2012, there was only a single national championship for men's volleyball. As such, all NCAA men's volleyball programs, whether from Division I, Division II, or Division III, were eligible. A total of 4 teams were invited to contest this championship. This was the final year of the Third Place Match.

Tournament bracket 
Site: Springfield Civic Center, Springfield, Massachusetts

All tournament team 
Jeff Nygaard, UCLA (Most outstanding player)
John Speraw, UCLA
Stein Metzger, UCLA
 Iván Contreras, Penn State
Todd Reimer, Ball State
 Yuval Katz, Hawaiʻi

See also 
 NCAA Men's National Collegiate Volleyball Championship
 NCAA Women's Volleyball Championships (Division I, Division II, Division III)

References

1995
NCAA Men's Volleyball Championship
NCAA Men's Volleyball Championship
1995 in sports in Massachusetts
Volleyball in Massachusetts